Lucian Leape is a physician and professor at Harvard School of Public Health, who has been active in trying to improve the medical system to reduce medical error.  In 1994 he had an article, "Error in Medicine," published in JAMA, which called for the application of systems theory to prevent medical errors. In 1997, he testified before a subcommittee of the US Senate with his recommendations for improving medical safety.

Leape earned the Eagle Scout award as a youth and has been recognized by the Boy Scouts of America as a Distinguished Eagle Scout.

He graduated from Harvard Medical School in 1959 after receiving an AB from Cornell University in 1952.

References

External links
Dr. Leape's Testimony before a US Senate subcommittee

American pediatric surgeons
Harvard School of Public Health faculty
Living people
Harvard Medical School alumni
Cornell University alumni
Year of birth missing (living people)